Alex Farm Pastures is a  biological Site of Special Scientific Interest south of Shadoxhurst in Kent.

This site has unimproved neutral grassland, which is a nationally rare habitat. Some of it has been lost to scrub, but in other areas it is maintained by rabbit grazing. There are several uncommon butterflies, including the nationally scarce pearl-bordered fritillary and small pearl-bordered fritillary.

The site is private land with no public access.

References

Sites of Special Scientific Interest in Kent